Tinderbox is an album by Stiff Little Fingers, released in 1997. Steve Grantley played bass on the album.

Critical reception
The Washington Post called the album "hard-hitting," writing that "there's no way it can recapture the impact of the band's '70s work."

AllMusic wrote that "the biggest surprise is a churning, rubber-burning remake of 'The Message', Grandmaster Flash & the Furious Five's searing indictment of inner-city misery."

Track listing
"You Never Hear the One That Hits You" (Burns) – 2:53
"(I Could Be) Happy Yesterday" (Burns) – 4:06
"Tinderbox" (Burns) – 3:57
"Dead of Night" (Burns) – 5:20
"The Message" (Grandmaster Flash and the Furious Five) – 3:06
"My Ever Changing Moral Stance" (Burns) – 2:48
"Hurricane" (Burns) – 4:25
"You Can Move Mountains" (Burns, Foxton) – 4:16
"A River Flowing" (Burns) – 3:25
"You Don't Believe in Me" (Burns) – 3:24
"In Your Hands" (Burns) – 4:00
"Dust in My Eyes" (Burns, Foxton) – 2:43
"Roaring Boys (Part One)" (Burns) – 4:27
"Roaring Boys (Part Two)" (Burns) – 6:05

Personnel
Stiff Little Fingers
Jake Burns - guitar, vocals
Bruce Foxton - bass; vocals on "Dust in My Eye"
Steve Grantley - drums, percussion
with:
Ian McCallum - backing vocals
Billy Boy Miskimmin - harmonica
Holly Roberts - keyboards
Tim Sanders - tenor saxophone
Simon Clarke - alto and baritone saxophone
Roddy Lorimer - trumpet
John Curtis - tin whistle
Theresa Heanue - fiddle

References

Stiff Little Fingers albums
1997 albums